Martin Lohse (born May 29, 1971) is a Danish classical composer and visual artist.

Biography
Martin Lohse was born in Copenhagen, where he began his education at the Musical Science Institute (1990–92) in addition to studies in rhetoric and math (1992–93) as well as geology (1994) at the University of Copenhagen. In 1995 he was admitted to the Royal Danish Academy of Music, Copenhagen, where he studied composition and music theory as a pupil of Hans Abrahamsen and Niels Rosing-Schow. In 2000 he started a postgraduate course in composition and in 2004 he had his debut from the Royal Academy of Music, where he also got a master in music theory in 2005. 
Currently he is associate professor in music theory and head of the Music Theory Department at the Royal Danish Academy of Music.

Music

Romantic and, to some extent, Baroque music and minimalism are key elements in the music of Martin Lohse. Symphony in one movement, Collage de temps, In liquid... and Smoke all have a reminiscence of the romantic style: Small motives and longer themes within a gliding tonality in a sculptural sound-universe, mixed with a floating sensation of times, sometimes with long and continues accelerandoes or decelerandoes and at other times with tempos slowly departing from each other.

The Baroque style is clear in a piece like Concerto in G, Concerto in tempi and Koncert but it's also a part of works like Collage de temps, In liquid... and Entity.

The music has some polystylist elements, not in the form of big clashes of different styles, but more in the sense of polytonality including polytempoes, f. ex in the work In liquid... for accordion and symphony orchestra, where the accordion in the 1. movement starts slowly together with the piano, but gradually makes a forceful accelerando toward a brilliant baroque figure in a direct collision with the piano, which keeps the slow steady music from the start.

New Simplicity is an essential part of his music, with a direct input from his teacher Hans Abrahamsen, but also evolved with the meeting with Arvo Pärt and his music. It is used to concentrate the music, finding the essence in a motive, a harmonic progression or in a structural complex created by the composer. In works like Moto immoto, Slow movement, Sorrow and 4. movement of In liquid... for accordion and piano the minimalism is transformed or rather reduced to a nearly pure transcendental form.

Accordion

Martin Lohse has composed several solo-, chamber- and orchestral works dedicated to international renowned accordionists Bjarke Mogensen, Geir Draugsvoll and Hanzhi Wang and his accordion works are played at international accordion competitions, community gatherings and festivals on a regular basis.

Mobile
A musical technique developed by Martin Lohse in 2009 where he combines the polystylistic elements with a simple repeating sequence of chords, creating a music with both baroque and romantic elements, all in different tempos but with no or very few dissonances.

Performances
Lohses works have been widely performed.
Selected performances: 
 Numus Festival in Aarhus (2000 and 2001), Denmark
 Louisiana Museum of Modern Art near Copenhagen
 Danish radio
 Young Nordic Music Festival (UNM) in Oslo (1998) and Reykjavik (2002)
 Composers Biennale 2002, Copenhagen
 Magma, Nordic Music Days (2002)
 Warsaw Autumn (2002) (2004)
 Carnegie Hall 2011 and 2018

Awards
Received the 3-year Grant from the Danish Arts Foundation in 2003 and the Hakon Børresen Award in 2012.

Works
Selected works

Orchestral works
 Lurid Light W.5 (1998) (symphony orchestra)
 Moto immoto W.35 (2009/2018) (symphony orchestra)
 Symphony in one movement W.58 (2020) (symphony orchestra)

Concertos
 In liquid... (accordion concerto) W.29b (2008–10) (accordion and symphony orchestra)
 Collage de temps W.41 (2013) (piano and sinfonietta)
 Concerto in G W.51 (2018) (recorder and baroque strings)

Vocal works
 The Dying Child W.4 (1998) (4-part choir)
 Tree haiku W.7 (1999) (12-part choir)
 Utroligheds frø W.15 (2002) (psalm, 4-part choir)
 The Treads of Man W.16 (2002) (mezzo-soprano solo)

Chamber works
 For at forfølge det håb... W.1 (1997) (mezzo-soprano and violin)
 Istid W.2 (1997) (clarinet, violin, cello and piano)
 Haiku W.6 (1999) (clarinet, violin, cello and piano)
 Smoke W.8 (2000) (clarinet, violin, cello and piano)
 Koncert W.10 (2001) (clarinet, violin, cello and piano)
 In liquid... W.18 (2003) (violin, and piano)
 Image balancantes W.22a (2004) (clarinet, violin, cello and piano)
 Nocturne W.25 (2007) (piano solo)
 In liquid... W.26 (2003–08) (accordion and piano)
 8 momenti mobile W.27 (2008) (saxophone quartet)
 Concerto in tempi W.34 (2010) (accordion and piano)
 5 momenti mobile W.42 (2013) (accordion duo and piano trio)
 Ver W.55 (2019) (guitar duo)

Solo works
 Passing w.36 (2011-12) (accordion)
 Menuetto W.27b.5 (2008/2014) (accordion)
 Seasons W.47 (2016) (accordion)
 Fast track 49b (2017) (organ)
 Encircled W.52 (2018) (accordion)
 L'eau W.54 (2019) (guitar)

Electroacoustic works
 Vibration in blue and yellow (2000) (Electronic music)
 Entity W.14a (1999–2002) (solo violin and five delays)
 Slow movement (2004) (Electronic music: orchestra samples)
 Sorrow (2006) (Electronic music: orchestra samples)
 Change ringing W.31 (2009) (clarinet, harp, marimba and electronic music: orchestra samples)
 Wood on strings W.32 (2010) (string quartet and five delays)
 Speed W.33 (2010) (solo marimba and five delays)
 Moto in moto (2010) (Electronic music: orchestra samples)
 The Earth and the Sea W.56 (2019) (solo cello and delays)

Correspondence chess
Awarded the grandmaster title in the International Correspondence Chess Federation in 2009.
Best result is a 3. place in the candidate tournament WCCC28CTO3, where a 1-2. place qualify to the final in the World Championship.

Bibliography
 2017 Bach Kontrapunkt – Tostemmig invention I and II,  and 
 2019 Bach Counterpoint – Two-part invention I and II,  and

Notes

References
 Pryn, Christine. "Martin Lohse - en komponist med hjerte og hjerne", Dansk Musik Tidsskrift; Årgang 79, 2004-2005 - 02, page 57-60 (in Danish)
 Dacapo Records, Biography; Lohse, Martin
 Naxos Records, Biography; Lohse, Martin
 Warsaw Autumn 2004. Composers; Martin Lohse
 Cornelius, Jens, Booklet, Accordion Concertos, Bjarke Mogensen and the Danish National Chamber Orchestra, Dacapo Records
 Booklet, Mobile - Works for Solo Accordion, Bjarke Mogensen
 Modern Accordion Perspectives: 'Longterm collaboration'
 Booklet, Road to Cordoba, Weronika Sura (Accordion), Opus series, Requiem records
 Mortensen, Trine Boje, Booklet, Collage de temps. Dacapo Records
 Mortensen, Trine Boje, Komponistbasen.dk, Danish Composers' Society
 Material published in the libraries of Denmark
 Official site; International Correspondence Chess Federation (ICCF)
 Homepage; Martin Lohse

External links

 
 

1971 births
Living people
20th-century classical composers
21st-century classical composers
Danish classical composers
Danish male classical composers
Correspondence chess grandmasters
Danish chess players
20th-century Danish male musicians
21st-century male musicians